...All This Time is a live album and concert film by Sting, recorded and filmed on 11 September 2001. It was recorded at Sting's Villa Il Palagio in Italy in front of a select audience drawn from his fan club and features live versions of Sting's songs from his Police and solo song catalogue. The album and video get their name from the song of the same name from his album The Soul Cages.

Background
Sting wanted to put together a concert in his home at Villa Il Palagio in Tuscany, Italy, so he enlisted a group of musicians to practice and perform with him. The events leading up to the night of the performance were filmed, and during these events on the day of the performance, the September 11 attacks perpetrated against the United States occurred, and the assembled group of musicians was made aware of this. The group performed the concert as originally intended, although Sting indicates on the DVD documentary the tone of the evening was quite different from how it was originally intended. Additionally, the "Desert Rose" performance featuring vocalist Cheb Mami was canceled due to the same circumstances.

As a result of the tragic events, the concert was dedicated to those who lost their lives that day.  Inside the CD booklet, upon the first page, it is stated, "This album was recorded on September 11, 2001, and is respectfully dedicated to all those who lost their lives on that day." Thereafter, the lyrics for the included song "Fragile" are also transcribed; of the full song list comprising the CD, only the lyrics for this one song are within the booklet.

The concert documentary was directed by Jim Gable and the documentary portion was edited by Scott C. Wilson and Jeffrey Doe.

CD track listing
All songs written by Sting, except where noted.

"Fragile" – 4:35
"A Thousand Years" (Kipper, Sting) – 3:01
"Perfect Love...Gone Wrong" - 4:11
"All This Time" – 5:20
"Seven Days" (Japan Bonus track) – 4:39
"The Hounds of Winter" – 4:29
"Mad About You" (excluded from US edition) – 3:37
"Don't Stand So Close to Me" – 2:15
"When We Dance" – 4:53
"Dienda" (Kenny Kirkland, Sting) – 3:14
"Roxanne" – 3:37
"If You Love Somebody Set Them Free" – 4:57
"Brand New Day" – 4:46
"Fields of Gold" – 3:50
"Moon over Bourbon Street" – 2:55
"Shape of My Heart" (Sting, Dominic Miller) (UK/Japan Bonus track) – 2:06
"If I Ever Lose My Faith in You" – 4:31
"Every Breath You Take" – 5:04

DVD track listing

"Fragile"
"A Thousand Years"
"Perfect Love...Gone Wrong"
"All This Time"
"Seven Days"
"The Hounds of Winter"
"Don't Stand So Close to Me"
"When We Dance"
"Dienda"
"Roxanne"
"If You Love Somebody Set Them Free"
"Brand New Day"
"Fields of Gold"
"Moon Over Bourbon Street"
"Shape of My Heart"
"If I Ever Lose My Faith in You"
"Every Breath You Take"

 The DVD edition includes bonus performances of "Every Little Thing She Does Is Magic," "Fill Her Up," and "Englishman in New York." It also includes rehearsals and a behind-the-scenes documentary of the making of the CD.

Personnel 
 Sting – lead vocals, guitars, bass guitar 
 Dominic Miller – guitars, backing vocals
 B. J. Cole – pedal steel guitar
 Christian McBride – acoustic bass
 Jaques Morelenbaum – cello
 Kipper – keyboards, programming 
 Jason Rebello – acoustic piano 
 Jeff Young – organ, backing vocals 
 Manu Katché – drums
 Marcos Suzano – percussion
 Haoua Abdenacer – darbuka
 Clark Gayton – trombone 
 Chris Botti – trumpet
 Katreese Barnes – backing vocals 
 Janice Pendarvis – backing vocals

Production 
 Kipper – producer
 Sting – producer
 Martin Kierszenbaum – A&R 
 Simon Osborne – recording, mixing
 Donal Hodgson – Pro-Tools, second engineer
 Peter "Hopps" Lorimer – assistant engineer
 Stefano Marchioni – assistant engineer 
 Mixed at Fonoprint (Bologna, Italy)
 Chris Blair – mastering at Abbey Road Studios (London, UK)
 Tam Fairgrieve – production manager
 Richard Frankel – package design 
 Danny Clinch – photography 
 Kathryn Schenker – management

Additional credits
 James Bolton – stage manager 
 Vidi Wash – monitor engineer 
 Jim Ebdon – sound engineer 
 Simon Bauer – sound technician 
 Danny Quatrochi – bass technician
 Donny FitzSimmonds – drum technician
 Phil Docherty – guitar technician
 Peter "Hopps" Lorimer – keyboard technician

Charts

Weekly charts

Year-end charts

Certifications

References

External links
Album's entry at Sting.com
Video's entry at Sting.com

Sting (musician) live albums
2001 live albums
A&M Records live albums
Albums produced by Kipper (musician)
Sting (musician) video albums